The Garden is a 1981 album by John Foxx, the follow-up to his debut solo album Metamatic, released the previous year. By comparison, it features more diverse instrumentation and romantic stylings.

Production and style
The sound and subject matter of The Garden were informed by a number of factors: the composer's Catholic upbringing and early exposure to Latin mass and Gregorian chant; his exploration of England's countryside, architecture and history following the release of Metamatic; and the song "Systems of Romance", which had been written during sessions for the Ultravox album of the same name but was not included on the record, even though its title was used.

Another connection between The Garden and Systems of Romance the album was the presence of guitarist Robin Simon, whose textured style had been a significant influence on the sound of the earlier release. Whereas on Metamatic the only conventional instrument had been bass guitar, Foxx used a full band of musicians on The Garden to play electric and acoustic guitar, electric bass, piano, and acoustic percussion, in addition to synthesizers and drum machines.

Regarding the album's title and the influence of his travels through England, in a 1981 interview with Bruce Elder on Australian radio Triple J Foxx said, "'The Garden' seemed to be a pretty good metaphor because I found a lot of gardens that were overgrown and ruined and a lot of very grand buildings that were almost decaying - but I found them a lot more beautiful than they were in their original state, being overgrown".

The opening track, "Europe After the Rain", encapsulated the style of the album as a whole, featuring discreet synthesizer work in concert with piano, acoustic guitar and a digital drum machine; its title came from a Max Ernst painting. The tune of "Night Suit" betrayed a funk influence, whilst its lyrics were among many on the album that alluded to 'The Quiet Man', an alternative persona Foxx had developed prior to Ultravox's Systems of Romance and which inspired one of its key songs, "Quiet Men". Foxx saw The Quiet Man as the epitome of detachment and observation, and claimed to often write from his perspective.

Two songs that  reflected the influence of church music and prayer were 
"Pater Noster" and the final/title track. The former was played entirely by Foxx, the Lord's Prayer sung in Latin against an electronic disco beat and the composer’s 'Human Host', a collection of tapes, vocoders and synthesizer sounds. The latter was a manifestation of the inspiration Foxx took from rural England and cathedral architecture; musically it also bore some resemblance to the final track on Systems of Romance, "Just for a Moment".

Release and aftermath
The Garden spent six weeks in the UK charts in 1981, peaking at #24. Initial vinyl copies included a glossy booklet called "Church", with words and photographs by Foxx. "Europe After the Rain" b/w "This Jungle" (plus "You Were There" on 12-inch) was released as the first single, a month prior to the album, making #40. "Dancing Like a Gun" b/w "Swimmer 2" (plus "Swimmer 1" on 12-inch) followed in October 1981 but did not chart. The non-album B-sides appear on the 2001 reissue of The Garden. The album, particularly its title track, is generally cited as having influenced Foxx's current ambient output, Cathedral Oceans (1995) and its sequels.

Track listing
All songs written by John Foxx.

 "Europe After the Rain" – 3:57
 "Systems of Romance" – 4:02
 "When I Was a Man and You Were a Woman" – 3:37
 "Dancing Like a Gun" – 4:10
 "Pater Noster" – 2:32
 "Night Suit" – 4:26
 "You Were There" – 3:51
 "Fusion/Fission" – 3:48
 "Walk Away" – 3:52
 "The Garden" – 7:03

1993 reissue bonus tracks

 "Young Man" – 2:53
 "Dance With Me" – 3:29
 "A Woman on a Stairway" – 4:29
 "The Lifting Sky" – 4:48
 "Annexe" – 3:10
 "Wings and a Wind" – 5:15

Most of these bonus tracks date from The Golden Section sessions, an album which was not reissued in 1993, explaining the juggling of bonus tracks for the 2001 reissue series.

2001 reissue bonus tracks

 "A Long Time" – 3:49
 "This Jungle" – 4:41
 "Swimmer 2" – 3:31 (effectively "Swimmer 1")
 "Swimmer 1" – 5:10 (effectively "Swimmer 2")
 "Young Man" – 2:53

2008 reissue bonus disc

 "Swimmer II"
 "This Jungle"
 "Miles Away"
 "A Long Time"
 "Swimmer I" 
 "Fog"
 "Swimmer III"
 "Swimmer IV"
 "Dance With Me" (early version)
 "A Woman on a Stairway"  (early version)
 "Fusion/Fission" (early version)
 "Miles Away" (alternative version)

Personnel
 Duncan Bridgeman – synthesizer, bass, percussion, bongos, cymbals, tom-toms, sequencer, brass, piano, the Human Host
 Jake Durant – bass
 Jo Dworniak – bass
 John Foxx – synthesizer, piano, guitar, vocals, drum programming, tom-toms, the Human Host
 Gareth Jones – percussion
 Philip Roberts – drums
 Robin Simon – guitar

Notes

References
 Vladimir Bogdanov, Chris Woodstra, Stephen Thomas Erlewine, John Bush (2001). All Music Guide to Electronica.

External links
 Assembly CD liner notes
 Barcode interview

John Foxx albums
1981 albums
Virgin Records albums